Tamara Aihie is a Nigerian host, and screenwriter, best known for writing Rise of the Saints. She is also one of the writers of the Nigerian thriller seriesBlood Sisters.

Filmography
Blood Sisters (2022)
Rise of the Saints (2020)
The Yellow Wall (2019 - 2020)
On The Real (2016)
Shade Corner
Inspector K(2018)
Money.Men.Marriage (2017)

References

External links

Living people
Nigerian women writers
Nigerian screenwriters
Year of birth missing (living people)